Borzeşti may refer to several places in Romania:

 Borzeşti, a village in Oneşti City, Bacău County
 Borzeşti Church, built at the order of Ştefan cel Mare in 1494
 Borzeşti, a village in Ungureni Commune, Botoşani County
 Borzeşti, a village in Iara Commune, Cluj County

See also
 Borzești Petrochemical Plant, Oneşti
 Borzești Power Station, Oneşti
 Borzești II Power Station, Oneşti